Eleonora Valentinovna Mitrofanova (born 11 June 1953) is a Russian diplomat. She currently serves as the Ambassador of Russia to Bulgaria, having held the post since 15 January 2021. She is the first woman to hold the post of First Deputy Minister of Foreign Affairs.

Career 
Mitrofanova is a graduate of the Moscow State Institute of International Relations, specializing in International economics.

Deputy Minister of Foreign Affairs (2003-2009)
In May 2003, President Vladimir Putin appointed Mitrofanova by decree to the post of the First Deputy Minister of Foreign Affairs. After the abolition of the Russian Ministry of Affairs of Federation and Nationalities her mandate included also the activities of the Roszaroubezhcentre of the MFA.

Ambassador-at-large to UNESCO (2009-2016)
She was previously ambassador-at-large of the Ministry of Foreign Affairs and a Permanent Delegate of to UNESCO.

Ambassador to Bulgaria (2021-present)
On 15 January 2021 she was appointed Ambassador of Russia to Bulgaria.

As a result of the 2022 Russian invasion of Ukraine and the Russian government's response to it in Bulgaria, in late March 2022, Mitrofonova was criticized for making "undiplomatic, sharp and rude" statements against the Bulgarian government and its citizens.  

In April 2022, Mitrofanova proceeded to harshly criticize an initiative of the Bulgarian citizens and government to rename the alley in front of the Russian Embassy as 'Heroes Of Ukraine' Lane, and a neighboring alley to be renamed to Boris Nemtsov Lane, in commemoration of the infamously slain Russian opposition figure.

As a result of the controversies, there have been widespread talks about declaring Mitrofanova as persona-non-grata, due to the abrasive, disrespectful and undiplomatic nature in which she has addressed the Bulgarian government and citizens.

In the evening of 27 June the Russian embassy in Sofia launched a charity appeal for Bulgarians to support the Russian invasion of Ukraine. One day later, Petkov announced the expulsion of 70 Russian diplomats over concerns of espionage. The Ministry of Foreign Affairs announced that Bulgaria would be temporarily closing down its diplomatic mission in Yekaterinburg and expected Russia to temporarily halt the activities of its own mission in Ruse, Bulgaria. All services of the Russian embassy were halted, and Bulgaria stipulated that Russia must follow from thenceforth the official standard of limiting their numbers to 23 diplomatic staff and 25 administrative staff.

Personal life 
She is married and is the mother of three children. Her brother Alexei Mitrofanov is a politician and former MP. Outside of Russian, she is fluent in English, Spanish and French.

Decorations 
 Medal of the Order "For Merit to the Fatherland" (2008)
 Order of Friendship (2003)
 Order of Honour (2013)
 Olympia National Award (2003)
 Order of Douslyk (Tatarstan, 2017)
 Order of the Holy Queen of Milica (Serbian Orthodox Church, 2018)

References

External link

1953 births
Living people
Ambassador Extraordinary and Plenipotentiary (Russian Federation)
Permanent Delegates of Russia to UNESCO
Ambassadors of Russia to Bulgaria
Russian women diplomats
Women ambassadors
First convocation members of the State Duma (Russian Federation)